Funny Magic is a 1969 Soviet fairy tale film directed by Boris Rytsarev based on the play by Nina Gernet and Grigory Yagdfeld.

Plot
Picking unknown flowers in the field, girl Katya did not even suspect that she had found the miraculous Kashchei's grass that could cast a spell on Vasilisa the Beautiful. The old cleaning lady Akulina Ivanovna told the girl about this, in the distant past   Baba Yaga. Riding on a broomstick, they fly out of the library window towards adventures, grabbing a magic book, without which Kashchei cannot be defeated in any way.

Cast
Marina Kozodaeva as Katya
Andrey Voinovsky as Lisichkin
Valentina Sperantova as Akulina Ivanovna / Baba Yaga
Elizaveta Uvarova as Kikimora
Valentin Bryleev as Leshy
Fyodor Nikitin as Kashchei the Immortal
Natalya Enke as Zoya Petrovna
Svetlana Smekhnova as Vasilisa the Beautiful
 Zinaida Vorkul as  episode (uncredited)

References

External links 
 

1969 films
Soviet black-and-white films
Gorky Film Studio films
Films based on fairy tales
Soviet films based on plays